Francis Robert "Paddy" Turley (1908 – before 1960) was an Irish footballer who played in the Football League for Stoke City.

Career
Turley played for his home town club Newry Town before joining English side Stoke City in 1928. He was not able to establish himself in the first team and after making just five appearances in three seasons at the Victoria Ground he returned to Ireland with St Patrick's Athletic.

Career statistics

References

Stoke City F.C. players
English Football League players
1900s births
Year of death missing
Newry City F.C. players
St Patrick's Athletic F.C. players
Sportspeople from Newry
Association football defenders
Association footballers from Northern Ireland